National Route 251 is a national highway of Japan connecting Nagasaki, Nagasaki and Isahaya, Nagasaki in Japan, with a total length of 148.2 km (92.09 mi).

References

National highways in Japan
Roads in Nagasaki Prefecture